Perfect Match is the title of an ESPN game show which ran October 3 to December 30, 1994; The series was hosted by Ken Ober and co-hosted by Challen Cates. Lou DiMaggio was the announcer.

Main Game
Two contestants faced-off in a head-to-head competition. Two games were played each show, each one had two rounds; the first game was played with two women, and the second game was played with two men.

The goal in each round is match all 12 answers to all 12 clues, under one category. The player in control had 30 seconds to make as many matches as he/she can. Host Ober read a clue, and the contestant had to choose which of the answers matched with the clue. Each correct answer earned points. In round one, each match was worth 3 points (for a total of 36), and in round two, each match was worth 7 points (for a total of 84), for a possible grand total of 120 points. The man & woman with the most points went on to play the bonus round.

Bonus Round
In the bonus round, the winning team (the man & woman that won) had 45 seconds to make 12 matches. If they can do that, they win a grand prize. But if they can't do that, they still won a consolation prize.

Home Viewers
Home viewers could participate in special phone games, and the winner each month got $2,500 from Ken.

External links
 http://www.chris-lambert.com/GSP.html - First, click "The Original Game Show Page!", then click "The Sports Game Show Page", then click "The Bench", and scroll down a bit. That's where you'll find info.

1990s American game shows
1994 American television series debuts
1994 American television series endings